Malachi 3 is the third chapter of the Book of Malachi in the Hebrew Bible or the Old Testament of the Christian Bible. This book contains the prophecies attributed to the prophet Malachi, and is a part of the Book of the Twelve Minor Prophets.

Text
The original text was written in Hebrew language. This chapter is divided into 18 verses. Masoretic Texts regard the six verses of chapter 4 as a part of chapter 3, making the total of 24 verses.

Textual witnesses
Some early manuscripts containing the text of this chapter in Hebrew are of the Masoretic Text, which includes the Codex Cairensis (895), the Petersburg Codex of the Prophets (916), Aleppo Codex (10th century), Codex Leningradensis (1008). Fragments containing parts of this chapter were found among the Dead Sea Scrolls, including 4Q76 (4QXIIa; 150–125 BCE) with extant verses 1–18 (and verses 3:19–24 in Masoretic Text); and 4Q78 (4QXIIc; 75–50 BCE) with a extant verses 6–7?.

There is also a translation into Koine Greek known as the Septuagint, made in the last few centuries BCE. Extant ancient manuscripts of the Septuagint version include Codex Vaticanus (B; B; 4th century), Codex Sinaiticus (S; BHK: S; 4th century), Codex Alexandrinus (A; A; 5th century) and Codex Marchalianus (Q; Q; 6th century).

Verse 1
 Behold, I will send my messenger,
 and he shall prepare the way before me:
 and the Lord, whom ye seek,
 shall suddenly come to his temple,
 even the messenger of the covenant, whom ye delight in:
 behold, he shall come, saith the Lord of hosts.
"Messenger": the identity of this personn is disputed as no angel or heavenly visitant is clearly  meant from historical considerations, because no such event took place immediately before the Lord came to his temple, nor can Malachi himself be intended, as his message was delivered nearly four hundred years before Messiah came. The announcement is doubtless based on Isaiah 40:3, who is generally regarded by Christians to be John the Baptist, the herald of Christ's advent (Matthew 11:10; John 1:6).
 "Prepare the way before me" The expression is borrowed from Isaiah 40:3 (comp. also Isaiah 57:14; Isaiah 62:10). He prepares the way by preaching repentance, and thus removing the obstacle of sin which stood between God and his people. Luke 1. The prophecy on John the Baptist's birth: "Thou, child, shalt be called the prophet of the Highest, for thou shalt go before the face of the Lord to prepare His way, to give knowledge of salvation unto His people, for the remission of their sins." Repentance was to be the preparation for the kingdom of Christ, the Messiah, for whom they looked so impatiently.
There is a change of persons here, as frequently. This is the person himself speaking, the Son of God, and promised Messiah, the Lord of all men, and particularly of his church and people, in right of marriage, by virtue of redemption, and by being their Head and King; so Kimchi and Ben Melech interpret it of him, and even Abarbinel himself; the Messiah that had been so long spoken of and so much expected, and whom the Jews sought after, either in a scoffing manner, expressed in the above question, or rather seriously; some as a temporal deliverer, to free them from the Roman yoke, and bring them into a state of liberty, prosperity, and grandeur; and others as a spiritual Saviour, to deliver from sin, law, hell, and death, and save them with an everlasting salvation.
 "Shall suddenly come to his temple": Jehovah shall unexpectedly come to his temple (τὸν ναὸν ἑαυτοῦ) as King and God of Israel (comp. ). There was a literal fulfilment of this prophecy when Christ was presented in the temple as an infant (Luke 2:22, etc.). 
 "suddenly" — This epithet marks the second coming, rather than the first; the earnest of that unexpected coming to judgment was given in the judicial expulsion of the money-changing profaners from the temple by Messiah, where also as here He calls the temple His temple. Also in the destruction of Jerusalem, most unexpected by the Jews, who to the last deceived themselves with the expectation that Messiah would suddenly appear as a temporal Saviour.

Verse 17
And they shall be mine, saith the Lord of hosts, in that day when I make up my jewels; and I will spare them, as a man spareth his own son that serveth him.
"Jewels": or "special treasure"; translated from the Hebrew word , sgullah ("special property", "treasure"), which is a 'technical term referring to all the recipients of God’s redemptive grace, especially Israel'.

Uses

Music
The King James Version of verses 1–3 from this chapter is cited as texts in the English-language oratorio "Messiah" by George Frideric Handel (HWV 56).

See also
 Jacob
 Jerusalem
 Judah
Related Bible parts: Malachi 4, Matthew 11, Mark 1, Luke 1, Luke 7

Notes and references

Sources

External links

Jewish
Malachi 3 Hebrew with Parallel English
Malachi 3 Hebrew with Rashi's Commentary

Christian
Malachi 3 English Translation with Parallel Latin Vulgate

03